Matty Foster (born 25 June 2001) is an English professional rugby league footballer who plays as a  forward for St Helens in the Betfred Super League,

He spent time on loan from the Saints at the Leigh Centurions in the Super League.

Background
He signed from amateur team Blackbrook ARLFC. He has progressed through the St Helens scholarship programme and represented England U16 as well as the Lancashire Academy, debuting off of the bench against Salford Red Devils at the back end of the 2020 season.

Career
Foster made his first team début for St Helens, coming off the substitute interchange bench against the Salford Red Devils on 26 Oct 2020. Due to end-of-season fixture congestion caused by the COVID-19 pandemic, Saints fielded a very young side, resting the majority of first team players, in preparation of their derby match against the Wigan Warriors just four days later.

Leigh Centurions (loan)
On 17 March 2021, it was reported that he joined the Leigh Centurions in the Super League on the RFL's new two-week-loan system. This loan was discontinued after Foster suffered a dual jaw break within the squad's first round game against the Wigan Warriors.

Leigh Centurions (2nd loan)
On 4 August 2021 it was reported that he had signed for the Leigh club in the Super League on loan.

References

External links
St Helens profile

2001 births
Living people
English rugby league players
Leigh Leopards players
Rugby league players from St Helens, Merseyside
Rugby league second-rows
St Helens R.F.C. players